California's 20th State Assembly district is one of 80 California State Assembly districts. It is represented by Democrat Bill Quirk of Hayward.

District profile 
The district is located in the southern East Bay, centered on Hayward. The district is a major gateway between the Tri-Valley to the east, Silicon Valley to the south, and the rest of the San Francisco Bay Area.

Alameda County – 30.5%
 Ashland
 Castro Valley
 Cherryland
 Fairview
 Fremont – 51.1%
 Hayward
 San Lorenzo
 Sunol
 Union City

Election results from statewide races

List of Assembly Members 
Due to redistricting, the 20th district has been moved around different parts of the state. The current iteration resulted from the 2011 redistricting by the California Citizens Redistricting Commission.

Election results 1992 - present

2020

2018

2016

2014

2012

2010

2008

2006

2004

2002

2000

1998

1996

1994

1992

See also 
 California State Assembly
 California State Assembly districts
 Districts in California

References

External links 
 District map from the California Citizens Redistricting Commission

20
Government of Alameda County, California